Tony Humphries may refer to:

 Tony Humphries (administrator), former administrator of the British Indian Ocean Territory
 Tony Humphries (musician) (born 1957), DJ and producer